Thomas Henry McEwan (14 December 1885 – 16 June 1958) was an Australian rules footballer who played with Richmond in the Victorian Football League (VFL).

Notes

External links 

1885 births
1958 deaths
Australian rules footballers from Victoria (Australia)
Richmond Football Club players
Benalla Football Club players